Desmond Gorman (born 13 December 1964) is an Irish former professional footballer who played for a number of clubs on both sides of the Irish border.

Career
Gorman started his career with Dundalk, making his League of Ireland debut on 10 March 1985. His form attracted the attention of English side Arsenal, and he played for them in a friendly against Shamrock Rovers at Glenmalure Park in August 1986. While at Dundalk he won all domestic honours, and was top scorer during both the 1985–86 (with 11 goals) and 1987–88 (with 16 goals) seasons. In 1989, he moved to French club FC Bourges who he helped win promotion, and then to Derry City in October 1990. In the summer of 1991 he moved to Shelbourne, before signing with Linfield in December 1992. He stayed with Linfield until 1997, before playing with Newry Town, Bangor, Ards, Banbridge Town. He returned briefly to Dundalk in 2003, before retiring. He came out of retirement in 2007 to play briefly for Loughgall.

References

1964 births
Living people
Footballers from Manchester
Republic of Ireland association footballers
Dundalk F.C. players
Derry City F.C. players
Shelbourne F.C. players
Linfield F.C. players
Ards F.C. players
Banbridge Town F.C. players
League of Ireland players
League of Ireland XI players
NIFL Premiership players
Bourges 18 players
Association football forwards